Miss Grand Singapore is a national title bestowed upon a woman chosen to represent Singapore at Miss Grand International, an annual international beauty pageant promoting peace and opposing all forms of conflict. It was first introduced in 2013, when the first runner-up Miss World Singapore 2013, Elizabeth Houghton, was appointed to join the Miss Grand International 2013 contest in Thailand. After that, the license was transferred to different organizers until an organizer led by Iqmal Muhammad, Perada International, obtained the franchise in 2022.

Since the first debutants in 2013, Singapore's representatives have never secured any placements at the Miss Grand International pageant.

History

Singapore debuted in Miss Grand International in 2013, and the franchise was under the Miss World Singapore contest, which appointed the first runner-up of Miss World Singapore 2013, Elizabeth Houghton, to represent the country in the inaugural edition of Miss Grand International in Thailand. However, after the mentioned candidate was disqualified and sent back by the international organization before finishing the pageant tournament, their partnership was discontinued. Later in 2014, the franchise was obtained by a real estate development company, Islandia Group Limited.

Under the direction of the Islandia Group, the national pageant named "Miss Singapore Islandia" was held in 2014 as an entertainment event for the Singapore National Day Charity Gala to promote a new real estate project invested in the Riau Islands of Indonesia, "The Islandia."  The event was held at the Golden Mile Complex, which is largely an ethnic enclave for the Thai population in Singapore. The winner of the contest, Jasy ln Tan, was sent to compete at the  pageant in Thailand.

After the Islandia Group stopped all marketing campaigns for the aforementioned project on December 1, 2014, the license was purchased by the pageant organizer led by Alex Liu, Exclusive Resource Marketing Pte., Ltd. (ERM Singapore Marketing Group), which served as the national licensee for Miss Grand International Singapore from 2015 to 2018. The country representatives during that time were either appointed or determined through the Miss Singapore Beauty Pageant.

After three years of absence, Singapore rejoined the competition in 2022, the franchise was obtained by a medical doctor,  Iqmal Muhammad, who is currently serving as the director of Perada International.

Titleholders
The following is a list of Singapore representatives at the Miss Grand International contest.

Controversy
In the inaugural edition of the Miss Grand International pageant held in Thailand in 2013, the Singaporean representative, Elizabeth Houghton, was disqualified from the contest before finishing the pageant tournament. The vice president of the international firms stated that her misbehavior, Houghton violated the hotel's no-smoking rule by smoking in public and did not join most of the pageant activities by claiming to be unwell, causing the organizer to need her to retire from the competition. Houghton, however, confirmed with one of the management staff that guests can smoke on the balconies.

Houghton additionally claimed the reason for such an incident might be that she stood up for other contestants, Miss Germany and Miss Sweden, who were teased by the organizer for being fat, and as a result, she got blacklisted.

In addition to Miss Singapore, the representatives of Denmark, Sweden, and Ukraine also withdrew before entering the grand final round of the aforementioned international pageant.

References

External links

 

Singapore